The following outline is provided as an overview of and topical guide to the U.S. state of Iowa.

Iowa is located in the Midwestern United States, and often referred to as the "American Heartland". It derives its name from the Ioway people, one of the many American Indian tribes that occupied the state at the time of European exploration. Iowa was a part of the French colony of New France. After the Louisiana Purchase, settlers laid the foundation for an agriculture-based economy in the heart of the Corn Belt.  Iowa is often referred to as the "Food Capital of the World".

General reference 

 Names
 Common name: Iowa
 Pronunciation: 
 Official name: State of Iowa
 Abbreviations and name codes
 Postal symbol:  IA
 ISO 3166-2 code:  US-IA
 Internet second-level domain:  .ia.us
 Nicknames
 Hawkeye State
 Land of the Rolling Prairie
Tall Corn State
 Adjectival: Iowa
 Demonym: Iowan

Geography of Iowa 

 Geography of Iowa
 Administration: U.S. state, a federal state of the United States
 Location
 Northern hemisphere
 Western hemisphere
 Americas
 North America
 Anglo America
 Northern America
 United States of America
 Contiguous United States
 Central United States
 Corn Belt
 West North Central States
 Midwestern United States
 Population: 3,046,355 (2010 U.S. Census)
 Area: 56,272.81 sq mi (145,746 km2)

Places in Iowa 

 National Historic Landmarks in Iowa
 National Register of Historic Places listings in Iowa
 Bridges on the National Register of Historic Places in Iowa
 National Natural Landmarks in Iowa
 State parks in Iowa

Environment of Iowa 

Environment of Iowa
 Climate of Iowa
 Geology of Iowa
 Protected areas in Iowa
 State forests of Iowa
 Superfund sites in Iowa
 Wildlife of Iowa
 Fauna of Iowa
 Birds of Iowa

Natural geographic features of Iowa 

 Rivers of Iowa

Regions of Iowa 

 Northern Iowa

Administrative divisions of Iowa 

 The 99 counties of the state of Iowa
 List of Iowa townships, which are administrative divisions of the county government
 Municipalities in Iowa
 Cities in Iowa
 State capital of Iowa: Des Moines
 City nicknames in Iowa
 Unincorporated communities in Iowa

Demography of Iowa 

Demographics of Iowa

Government and politics of Iowa 

 Form of government: U.S. state government
 United States congressional delegations from Iowa
 Iowa State Capitol
 Elections in Iowa
 Political party strength in Iowa

Branches of the Government of Iowa

Executive branch of the government of Iowa 
Governor of Iowa
Lieutenant Governor of Iowa
 Secretary of State of Iowa
 Attorney General of Iowa
 State departments
 Iowa Department of Transportation

Legislative branch of the government of Iowa 

 Iowa General Assembly (bicameral)
 Upper house: Iowa Senate
 Lower house: Iowa House of Representatives

Judicial branch of the government of Iowa 

Courts of Iowa
 Supreme Court of Iowa

Law and order in Iowa 

Law of Iowa
 Cannabis in Iowa
 Constitution of Iowa
 Crime in Iowa
 Gun laws in Iowa
 Law enforcement in Iowa
 Law enforcement agencies in Iowa
 Iowa State Police
 Same-sex marriage in Iowa

Military in Iowa 

 Iowa Air National Guard
 Iowa Army National Guard

History of Iowa

History of Iowa

History of Iowa, by period 

Prehistory of Iowa
Indigenous peoples
Iowa archaeology
French colony of Louisiane, 1699–1764
Treaty of Fontainebleau of 1762
Spanish (though predominantly Francophone) district of Alta Luisiana, 1764–1803
Third Treaty of San Ildefonso of 1800
French district of Haute-Louisiane, 1803
Louisiana Purchase of 1803
Unorganized U.S. territory created by the Louisiana Purchase, 1803–1804
Lewis and Clark Expedition, 1804–1806
District of Louisiana, 1804–1805
Territory of Louisiana, 1805–1812
Territory of Missouri, 1812–1821
Unorganized Territory, (1821–1834)–1854
Territory of Michigan, 1805–(1834–1836)–1837
Territory of Wisconsin, (1836–1838)-1848
Honey War, 1837–1851
Territory of Iowa, 1838–1846
Mexican–American War, April 25, 1846 – February 2, 1848
State of Iowa becomes 29th State admitted to the United States of America on December 28, 1846
American Civil War, April 12, 1861 – May 13, 1865
Iowa in the American Civil War
First transcontinental railroad completed 1869
Herbert Hoover becomes 31st President of the United States on March 4, 1929

History of Iowa, by region 
 History of Davenport, Iowa
 History of Dubuque, Iowa
 History of Sioux City, Iowa

History of Iowa, by subject 
 Archeology of Iowa
 Archaeological sites in Iowa
 Blood Run Site
 Chan-Ya-Ta Site
 Cherokee Sewer Site
 Edgewater Park Site
 Effigy Mounds National Monument
 Fish Farm Mounds State Preserve
 Folkert Mound Group
 Fort Atkinson State Preserve
 Hartley Fort State Preserve
 Little Maquoketa River Mounds State Preserve
 Phipps Site
 Plum Grove Historic House
 Slinde Mounds State Preserve
 Toolesboro Mound Group
 History of Iowa Hawkeyes football
 Native American history of Iowa
 Appanoose
 Half-Breed Tract
 Ho-Chunk
 Keokuk (Sauk chief)
 Keokuk's Reserve
 Meskwaki
 Neapope
 Potawatomi
 Quashquame
 Sac (people)
 Sac and Fox Nation
 Sauganash
 Taimah
 University of Iowa Museum of Natural History
 Watseka

Culture of Iowa 

Culture of Iowa
 Cuisine of Iowa
 Museums in Iowa
 Religion in Iowa
 Episcopal Diocese of Iowa
 Scouting in Iowa
 State symbols of Iowa
 Flag of the State of Iowa 
 Great Seal of the State of Iowa

The Arts in Iowa 
 Music of Iowa

Sports in Iowa 

Sports in Iowa

Economy and infrastructure of Iowa 

Economy of Iowa
 Agriculture in Iowa
 Communications in Iowa
 Newspapers in Iowa
 Radio stations in Iowa
 Television stations in Iowa
 Energy in Iowa
 List of power stations in Iowa
 Solar power in Iowa
 Wind power in Iowa
 Health care in Iowa
 Hospitals in Iowa
 Transportation in Iowa
 Airports in Iowa
 Roads in Iowa

Education in Iowa 

Education in Iowa
 Schools in Iowa
 School districts in Iowa
 High schools in Iowa
 Private schools in Iowa
 Colleges and universities in Iowa
 University of Iowa
 Iowa State University

See also

Topic overview:
Iowa

Index of Iowa-related articles

References

External links 

Iowa
Iowa
Outline